Karmabai (20 January 1615 – 1634) was a Jat known as- Bhakt Shiromani Karmabai. She was born on 20 January 1615 in the family of Jiwanji Dudi in the village Kalwa situated in Nagaur district. She was a devotee of Krishna.
The story goes like this. Karmabai's father was a devotee of Krishna. Once he had to do some work away from home, so he instructed Karmabai to have food only after offering the food (bhog) to the lord. Karma was very young and she took this instruction literally. Next morning she woke up early and made khichdi for offering it to the Lord. But when she saw that lord was not eating, the innocent Karmabai did not eat anything at all and waited for lord to come and eat first.

Lord Krishna was very impressed by her determination and showed mercy on her. He himself appeared before her and ate her khichdi.

He followed the same routine till her father's return. When her father returned, she told him everything. Her father was shocked and refused to believe her. Karma pleaded before Lord to appear once again to prove her innocence. The merciful Lord Krishna thus appeared before Karma once again to prove his devotee's innocence.

It is common belief that she had offered 'khichadi' to Krishna in his presence. As this news spread and reached the saints of Puri, they asked Karmabai to come there and give Bhog of khichadi to the Lord. Krishna appeared there as well. After that, Karmabai started living in Puri.

A folk song tells the story like this -

Thali bhar'r lyayi khichado upar ghee ki batki  !

Jeemo mhara syam dhani jeemavai beti Jat ki !!

Karmabai took a living samādhi on 25 July 1634 in Puri.

Now during Puri Jagannath Rath Yatra, the chariot of Lord Jagannath stops near her samadhi for short period. It is believed that, without her sight the chariot couldn't move a single inch and it is God's own choice for Karmabai.

1615 births
1634 deaths
History of Rajasthan
People from Rajasthan